is a Japanese anime series by Toei Animation. The story is loosely based on the 1837 Hans Christian Andersen tale "The Little Mermaid". The series has been dubbed into various languages including French, Spanish, Polish and Italian. It is also often known as Mako the Mermaid, Mako-chan’s Magic, Syrenka Mako and Magical Mako-chan.

Mahō no Mako-chan aired in 1970 via Nippon Educational TV (NET), which is now TV Asahi.

Plot
Mako (her name is sometimes romanized as "Maco" or "Makko", and is changed to "Ginny" in the Italian version) is a mermaid and the youngest daughter of the Dragon King. She longs for the human world despite it being forbidden by her father. One stormy night, she saves a human boy from a wrecked ship and falls in love with him. Mako makes a deal with the sea hag and is transformed into a human high school girl with the condition that she can never be return to being a mermaid. With the magical pendant called the "Life of A Mermaid", Mako meets many people and experiences many things as she learns what it means to be human, while searching for the young man she saved.

As a human, Mako is taken in by the strict old man, Mr. Urashima. Urashima is a strict zoologist, who lost his daughter many years ago. He lives next door to two mischievous twins, Taro and Jiro, who become enamored with Mako. By episode 3, Mako is enrolled in the local high school, Karatachi Academy. There she makes friends, including Haruko and Bancho, and becomes the rival of the rich-girl, Tomiko Tomita. Early on in the series, Mako has a couple of encounters with the young man she saved, known as Akira Shigeno. Akira is a bit of a drifter, constantly taking new jobs, and never stays put in one place. Although Akira is trying to find the "mermaid who saved his life", Mako is unable to confess her true identity. 

Two years pass until Mako and Akira meet again. It is during this meeting that he begins to suspect Mako was truly the person who saved him on that fateful night. As Mako and Akira grow closer, the Dragon King is confronted by God, who is furious that his daughter is in the human world. God orders the King to return Mako to the sea. He refuses, and is punished. Onboard a cruise, Akira tells Mako he doesn't clearly remember the person who saved him, but comments that her scent is similar. Eventually he asks her to grab his wrist, and realizes she was in fact the person who saved him. Meanwhile, God unleashes his wrath, erupting a volcano, which nearly kills Mako, Akira, and her classmates. Mako tearfully renounces her love for humanity and Akira, throwing herself into the sea. God's fury is calmed, and the Dragon King is released, using his power to cease the calamity. Akira and Mako are briefly reunited, her father watches on with happiness. 

Sometime after that, Akira quits his job aboard the cruise ship, and Mako loses contact with him. She later finds him working as a racing driver. Mako is upset to see Akira has changed so much, becoming vain and only caring about money and fame. Akira insists he's still the same person, but she can't believe it. During this time, a gorilla escapes from a zoo and wreaks havoc nearby. Unable to use her magic, Mako is saved by Akira, who is unfortunately injured while fighting off the gorilla. As he lays dying in the hospital from his injuries, Mako tries to use her pendant to save him. Her father intervenes, saying the "Life of A Mermaid" cannot save a human life. Heartbroken, Mako throws herself into the ocean, swimming to the sea bottom. She intends to die the same time as Akira. Their spirits meet together, and Akira asks who exactly she is. Mako replies, "I'm Mako. A human born from foam, and returning to foam in order to love you". The Dragon King goes to save Mako, but is stopped by the sea hag. She tells him Mako is no longer his daughter, but a human girl. She tells the Dragon King if he saves Mako, it is only fair to save Akira as well. The Dragon King does so. 

The next morning Mako awakens in the hospital, where Mr. Urashima informs her a miracle happened, and Akira survived. Mako thanks her father, and tearfully reunites with Akira. In the epilogue, Akira decides to work as a sailor, just like his late father. He understands this is the best job for him to become a real man. Mako is happy for him, and asks if he could throw her pendant into the sea as he leaves Japan. She realizes she can't rely on it anymore, but rather rely on those around her. Mako says goodbye to the sea and to her pendant, but knows this isn't goodbye to Akira. The Dragon King and the sea hag watch, realizing Mako has finally truly become human. As Mako looks to the sea, a visage of her father fades away.

Characters
 
The 15-year-old heroine. She is the youngest daughter of the Dragon King but yearned to become a human so she can be with the boy she loves, Akira. Found by old fisherman Urashima and adopted as his granddaughter, she starts attending Karatachi School. 

Haruko 
Mako's classmate at school, she becomes her closest friend there. She wears glasses yet is more vociferous in opposing wrongs, or Tomiko for that matter. 

 
Jiro, along with his identical twin brother Taro, are old Urashima's real grandsons and helped him take Mako to the hospital. They also urged their grandfather to save her from traffickers who were about to sell her off. They love their adopted cousin and support her ideas of righteousness. 

 
Jiro's identical twin brother, Taro is the more realist of the two. 

 
Rough classmate of Mako's at Karatachi School. His real surname is Matsubashi. 

 
Bancho's friend and lieutenant. 

Tomiko 
Mako's classmate and rival. Her mother is president of the school's PTA, hence her arrogance. She also knows Akira and wants him. 

 
Mako's class' homeroom teacher. Kind and funny yet stern. 

 
The Dragon King himself. He is able to assume human form and appear on Earth so he can help, and scold, Mako. He often overrules his wife's overprotectiveness and lets his daughter do her own things, but is  stern, particularly with Mako's use of her magical pendant and the etiquette she should follow. 

 
The Dragon King's wife and mother of Mako. She rarely speaks and is only seen in flashbacks, but seems to be overprotective of Mako, unlike her husband and her mother who are willing to let her go her own way. 

 
A sea hag. She is able to communicate with Mako's father in his human form, and often derides his lack of control over Mako to spite him (even though it was thanks to her magic that Mako was able to become a terrestrial being). 

 
The old fisherman who found a nude and unconscious Mako on the beach after her transformation into a human being. He takes her in as his adoptive granddaughter. He's very stern, but deep down cares for Mako. (His surname, which Mako adopts, may be based on the legend of Urashima Tarō.) 

 
The young human Mako once saved from drowning, he had been on a cruise ship that capsized when the event occurred and thus lost a lot of his memory from the experience. Mako falls in love with him, but once she becomes a terrestrial being, he's not found so easily. Akira in truth is a drifter who does odd jobs and arrives and leaves town at will. He does like Mako's personality but is totally clueless about her feelings for him. (In some Latin American versions his given name is Shin'ichi instead of Akira.)

 
Tomiko's mother. Head of Karatachi's PTA and a wealthy donor to the school.

Twins' Mother 
Mother of Taro and Jiro. Raises and educates her sons in a very strict manner.

Principal 
Principal of Karatachi. Is strict with students, especially Mako, and often ingratiates herself to Mrs. Tomita in order to keep her donations to the school flowing.

Music
The scores and lyrics for Mahō no Mako-chan were created by Takeo Watanabe and performed by Horie Mitsuko. Some of the score was reused in later Toei series, including Majokko Megu-chan and Genshi Shonen Ryu.

Theme Songs

Opening Theme
"Mahō no Mako-chan" by Horie Mitsuko

Ending Theme
"BOKU wa MAKO ni tsuite yuku" by Horie Mitsuko

Episode List

 First Love (November 2nd, 1970)
 From The Sea, With Love (November 9th, 1970)
 Karatachi Academy (November 16th, 1970)
 A Fresh Seedling (November 23rd, 1970)
 Stolen Magic (November 30th, 1970)
 Tears of Reunion (December 7th, 1970)
 Visage of a Person (December 14th, 1970)
 Where is Santa? (December 21st, 1970)
 Fight at the Harbor Hill (December 28th, 1970)
 The School Star (January 4th, 1971)
 Don't Run, Jim! (January 11th, 1971)
 Sound of the Sea (January 18th, 1971)
 Date with Papa (January 25th, 1971)
 Drifting Youth (February 1st, 1971)
 The Trumpet Gambles for Tomorrow (February 8th, 1971)
 We Hate Uniforms (February 15th, 1971)
 A Flute Heard in The Winter Night (February 22nd, 1971)
 Two People in the Snow Storm (March 1st, 1971)
 A Youth Endangered (March 8th, 1971)
 The Stewardess and Pilot (March 15th, 1971)
 The Lying School (March 22nd, 1971)
 Someone is Calling Me (March 29th, 1971)
 Improvising Cupid (April 5th, 1971)
 Who am I? (April 12th, 1971)
 Beyond the Mountains (April 19th, 1971)
 The Troublemaker Prince (April 26th, 1971)
 The Red Galac (May 3rd, 1971)
 The Grand Angel (May 10th, 1971)
 Pretty Please! (May 17th, 1971)
 The Little Mermaid (May 24th, 1971)
 King of the Last Stop (May 31st, 1971)
 Lulu Lives On (June 7th, 1971)
 Walking Along Fawn Street (June 14th, 1971)
 Song of the Hangnail (June 21st, 1971)
 The Director's Many Changes (June 28th, 1971)
 I Sell Lives (July 5th, 1971)
 My First Lipstick (July 12th, 1971)
 Jungle Boss (July 19th, 1971)
 Don't Die, Mao (July 26th, 1971)
 How to Become A Bride (August 2nd, 1971)
 Chance Encounter (August 9th, 1971)
 A Single Record (August 16th, 1971)
 A Ghost is There (August 23rd, 1971)
 An Album Without Photos (August 30th, 1971)
 The Sunday Fellow (September 6th, 1971)
 Tears of a Monster (Part One) (September 13th, 1971)
 Tears of a Monster (Part Two) (September 20th, 1971)
 Until We Meet Again (September 27th, 1971)

References

External links
Official site (Japanese)

1970 anime television series debuts
Anime and manga based on fairy tales
Magical girl anime and manga
Toei Animation television
TV Asahi original programming
Witchcraft in television
Television shows based on The Little Mermaid